Delta Force is a series of first-person shooter video games by NovaLogic created in 1998. THQ Nordic acquired all Of NovaLogic's franchises on October 31, 2016.

Games 

 Delta Force was the first game in the series involving multiple campaigns including catching a drug lord in Peru and campaigns against rebels in Chad, Uzbekistan, Indonesia and the Russian island of Novaya Zemlya
 Delta Force 2 was a sequel involving a campaign against fictional international bioterrorist organization Da'nil's and fictional nuclear terrorist organization United Freedom. And the first one to have a mission editor to make player-created missions.
 Delta Force: Land Warrior is the third game involving fictional terrorist organization New Dawn and first to have named characters with backgrounds: Sniper Daniel Lonetree 'Longbow', Machine Gunner Rydel Wilson 'Pitbull', Demolition Expert Cole Harris 'Gas Can', female CQB expert Jen Tanaka 'Snake Bite' and female underwater combatant/medic Erica Swift 'Mako'.
 Delta Force: Task Force Dagger was a standalone expansion pack for Land Warrior and took place in the real conflict, War in Afghanistan and had the final mission based on the Battle of Tora Bora.
 Delta Force: Urban Warfare was the fifth and PS1 exclusive title first and only to have cutscenes and had the story of a Delta Force operative named John Carter who had taken part in a failed drug deal bust in Tumaco, Colombia and being sent undercover to capture or kill the drug lord and red mercury smuggler named Malik by CIA agent Robert Jackson. The drug lord in last part of the story tries to escape by plane and is shot down by John using a MANPAD.
 Delta Force: Black Hawk Down was the sixth title based on Ridley Scott's movie Black Hawk Down involving the Somali Civil War and First Battle of Mogadishu. It had new features of being able to operate .50 cals, miniguns and cannons from HMMWVs, Blackhawks and various technicals.
 Delta Force: Black Hawk Down - Team Sabre was an expansion pack of Black Hawk Down with two extra campaigns involving a fictional Colombian drug lord Antonio Paulo and a fictional Iranian coup by General Haatim Jaareeh Bin Shamim Kalb.
 Delta Force: Xtreme was the eighth title, remake of the first game and the first to have  player able to drive vehicles, motorcycles, tanks, boats and pilot helicopters and has the Peru, Chad, Novaya Zemlya campaign from the first game.
 Delta Force: Xtreme 2 was the ninth and currently final title made, a sequel to Xtreme and had two intervened campaigns involving a Central Asian arms smuggler Alian Khalid who has armed and is using a South-East Asian drug cartel by providing them military-grade weapons in exchange to following his orders and has aims to remove western influence in Middle-East. Missions involve attacking and destroying both groups.
 Delta Force Angel Falls was going to be the tenth title talking place in South America which was never released and is now considered vaporware due to the company's closure in 2016. It would had new features like waterfalls as per NovaLogic if it would had been released.

References 

Video game franchises introduced in 1998
First-person shooters by series